Celtic B is the reserve team of Celtic Football Club. They are based in Airdrie and compete in the Lowland League. Celtic have run a reserve side since the early days of the club, comprising a combination of emerging youth players and first-team squad players. The current "B" side forms the highest level of the Academy structure at Celtic, beneath which there are four junior strands: Professional Academy (Under 18s), Intermediate Academy (Under 13s, 14s, 15s & 16s), Junior Academy (Under 10s, 11s & 12s) and Development Centres (five years old and above).

History of reserve and youth football

Reserve football
Celtic ran a reserve side from their early days, known at the time as the Crusaders. Other clubs in the 1880s also gave their reserve sides distinctive names, with Rangers calling their Second XI the Swifts, and Queens Park naming their reserves the Strollers.

Celtic's first known involvement in reserve league football, was their participation in the Scottish Combination league in 1896. Several Scottish League clubs fielded 2nd XIs ('A' sides), as well as Queens Park Strollers. However, by the 1900s Celtic manager Willie Maley was only using a small, if versatile, squad of players, and the decision was made to stop fielding a reserve team altogether. In 1909, a new Scottish Reserve League was set up, again often including at least one non-reserve side of a non-league club in each of its seasons. Celtic did not participate. The league was disbanded during World War I, but effectively re-established in 1919 as the Scottish Alliance League. As with previous incarnations, this reserve league also contained the first XI of several non-league sides. Celtic took part for the first few seasons, and won the championship in 1921–22, however withdrew again after that for what is presumed were financial reasons. This appeared an unwise decision. Rangers went on to dominate Scottish football in the 1920s, and Celtic appeared to struggle without a reserve team to help blend younger players into the club's first team.

The club did re-introduce a reserve team in 1930, and won three Alliance championships in 1934, 1937 and 1938, and the Second XI Cup in 1935 and 1936. Malky MacDonald, Johnny Crum, George Paterson, Jimmy Delaney, John Divers and Willie Buchan all emerged during this time from the reserve side and went on to form the nucleus of the Celtic first team that won the league championship in 1936 and 1938, and the Scottish Cup in 1937. In 1936, Celtic fielded trialist Mohammed Salim in two Alliance league matches, with him becoming the first footballer from the Indian sub-continent to play for a European club. A league AGM in 1938, resulted in the non-league sides being removed and the league became exclusive to First Division reserve sides. The advent of World War II, however, once again saw the suspension of national reserve league football in Scotland, although regional leagues were set up.

The national Reserve League restarted at the end of the war, once again mirroring the sixteen club top-tier division. The subsequent years into the 1950s saw various changes to the leagues, but Celtic's achievements at reserve level were undistinguished, with two fourth-place finishes in 1952 and 1954 their highest positions. The Scottish (Reserve) League was set up in 1955, again mirroring the First Division although there were a number of seasons when not all of those clubs took part. This set-up, with minor variations, continued up until 1975. Jock Stein's appointment in 1957 as reserve team coach saw an upturn in Celtic's commitment to reserve team football. Future star players such as Pat Crerand, Billy McNeill, John Clark and Bertie Auld all emerged at Celtic during this time. The reserves won the Second XI Cup in 1958 (thrashing Rangers 8–2 on aggregate) and the reserve league title a year later. From 1958 up to 1966, Celtic also fielded a reserve side (effectively a 3rd XI) in the Combined Reserve League. Although Stein left in 1960 to manage Dunfermline Athletic, promising players continued to emerge from the reserves, such as Bobby Murdoch, Jimmy Johnstone and George Connelly.

The mid 1960s saw the emergence of one of Celtic's most notable reserve sides, a group that became known as the Quality Street Kids. Several became regulars in the first-team side, winning major honours and going on to represent Scotland at full international level, most notably Kenny Dalglish and Danny McGrain. In August 1968, the reserves needed to defeat Partick Thistle by at least seven goals to win their Reserve League Cup group section; Celtic won 12–0, with Lou Macari scoring four goals. That same year, the Celtic reserves played the Scotland national football team in a practice match; the young Celtic won 5–2. During season 1970–71, Celtic won all three main reserve honours - league, Reserve League Cup and Second XI Cup - scoring 157 goals in the process and becoming the first reserve team in Scotland to win the treble.

In 1975, the Scottish League was reorganized into Premier-First-Second. The Premier clubs were assigned to the Premier Reserve League and the lower league clubs used varying regionalised sections and midweek competitions. Key players continued to emerge from the youths and reserves; Roy Aitken, Tommy Burns and George McCluskey in the late 1970s, and Pat Bonner, Charlie Nicholas and Paul McStay in the 1980s. When the Scottish Premier League was founded in 1998, the reserve league was replaced by an under 21 league with some overage players permitted. Various changes to this set-up were made in subsequent years, eventually leading to the SPFL Development League which was contested by the Under-20 teams of 17 Scottish Professional Football League clubs, including Celtic, up to the end of season 2017–18. During the 2010s, James Forrest, Callum McGregor and Kieran Tierney all progressed as youths at Celtic and became established first-team players at the club. Tierney was later transferred to Arsenal for a transfer fee of £25m, a record fee for a Scottish footballer.

In July 2018, it was reported that reserve leagues would be reintroduced in lieu of the development leagues that had been in place since 2009. The top tier of the new SPFL Reserve League featured 18 clubs, whilst a second-tier reserve League comprised nine clubs. Other than a minimum age of 16, no age restrictions applied to the leagues. At the end of its first season (2018–19), Celtic – along with several other clubs – intimated that they would withdraw from the Reserve League to play a variety of challenge matches. They later entered a small league (under-21 plus three overage) along with three other Scottish clubs and Brentford and Huddersfield Town from the English leagues.

In the 2021/22 season, Celtic B (and Rangers B) began playing in the Lowland Football League (the fifth tier of the senior setup).  There was a proposal to include them in an expanded Scottish League Two (fourth tier) still under consideration by the SPFL for the year after that.

Cup competitions
There were numerous cup competitions for reserve sides since the earliest days; e.g. the Edinburgh 2nd XI Cup first played in the 1870s and the Scottish 2nd XI Cup which existed from 1882 to 1988. A plethora of cups were introduced during the 1880s but the advent of professionalism a decade later put pressure on club finances, and during the 1890s these tournaments gradually fell away. The Scottish 2nd XI Cup was first competed for during season 1881–82 and was competed for each season up until 1988. The Scottish Reserve League Cup was introduced in 1945 and was last held in season 2013–14. In June 2016, it was announced that the Challenge Cup would be expanded to include Under-20 sides from each Scottish Premiership club. In the 2016-17 edition, Celtic U20 won their opening tie against Annan Athletic and then eliminated Cowdenbeath (both of the fourth level)  before being knocked out by the then-League 1 club Livingston; they progressed further than all other Under-20s teams. In the 2017–18 Challenge Cup, the side were beaten by Annan Athletic in the first round.

International tournaments
Celtic's U20s were the first Scottish participants in the NextGen Series - a youth tournament based on the UEFA Champions League. In the 2011–12 season, Celtic were drawn against Barcelona, Manchester City and Marseille, and finished third in their group. Celtic confirmed that they would play in the 2012–13 edition tournament as well; the team were again eliminated in the Group Stage.

In 2013–14 Celtic's senior team qualified for the Champions League group stages, meaning that the youth squad could play in the first edition of the UEFA Youth League. In the following season there was no chance to participate in that competition due to the first team's failure to qualify, but in 2015–16 an additional route into the tournament opened up to domestic youth (Under-17) champions, and Celtic qualified as the Scottish holders of that title. After navigating two rounds, Celtic were eliminated on penalties by Valencia.

In 2016–17 the senior team succeeded in reaching the Champions League group stage, so the youth squad also entered that season's Youth League via that route (they had also qualified through the Under-17 path again in any case). In the Youth League, the Group Stage mirrored the tough draw in the senior tournament, and Celtic collected just one point and finished fourth. Qualification was the same in 2017–18 – the Under-17s won the Scottish league but in any case the first team reached the Champions League groups.

Celtic also successfully applied to compete in the 2014–15, 2015–16 and 2016–17 editions of the England-based Premier League International Cup.

Youth football
A Youth Division was set by the Scottish League in 1993 and ran until 2012. This was an Under-18 league initially, but changed to Under-19s from 2003 onwards. Celtic Youths won the league for four consecutive seasons from 2002-03 to 2005-06.

The Scottish Youth Cup was set up in 1984 and open to all senior clubs in Scotland. It was initially an U19 tournament, but is now for U20 sides. Celtic are historically the most successful club in the competition, winning 14 finals. The Glasgow Cup was for many years considered an important trophy for first-team sides in Glasgow, but by the 1980s had lost prestige and saw Celtic and Rangers usually fielding reserve sides. Due to lack of interest in the tournament as a senior competition, it was relaunched in 1989 as a youth tournament and is currently competed for by the U17 sides of senior league clubs in Glasgow.

Celtic B
As of August 2022

Note: squad numbers listed relate only to first team numbers. In "B" (or youth) matches, the team wear 1–11.

Out on loan

Under-18s
As of July 2022

Note: squad numbers listed relate only to first team numbers. In "B" (or youth) matches, the team wear 1–11.

Academy
The Celtic Youth Academy works with players from as young as five years of age, concentrating in early years on improving players technique, passing and possession. Players are actively encouraged to demonstrate their skills, including tricks and flicks, in match situations. The Academy also works in partnership with St Ninian's High School in Kirkintilloch, where players of secondary-school age benefit from nine coaching sessions per week.

The most promising players then progress to Celtic's Development Squad programme.

In 2017, the Celtic academy was one of eight across the country designated 'elite' status on the introduction of Project Brave, an SFA initiative to concentrate the development of the best young players at a smaller number of clubs with high quality facilities and coaching than was previously the case.

The youth academy currently comprises four levels: Professional Academy (Under 18s), Intermediate Academy (Under 13s, 14s, 15s & 16s), Junior Academy (Under 10s, 11s & 12s) and Development Centres (five years old and above).

Facilities
Since 2007, the club's academy and reserve sides have trained at the Lennoxtown Training Centre. In 2019, Celtic announced plans to redevelop their older Barrowfield training ground in eastern Glasgow near Celtic Park for use by the academy sides and their women's team, including an indoor pitch and a matchday venue, augmenting the Lennoxtown base which would continue to be used by the first team squad.

In July 2021, it was announced that the men's B-team (as well as the women's team) would play the majority of their home fixtures in 2021–22 at Airdrie's Penny Cars Stadium.

Staff

Honours

Reserves

League

Scottish Reserve League: 9
 1895–96, 1958–59, 1959–60, 1960–61, 1962–63, 1964–65, 1965–66, 1969–70, 1970–71

Premier Reserve League: 5
 1979–80, 1984–85, 1990–91, 1993–94, 1994–95

 SPL Reserve League: 5
 2004–05, 2005–06, 2006–07, 2007–08, 2008–09

 Scottish Alliance: 4
 1921–22, 1933–34, 1936–37, 1937–38

Cup

 Scottish 2nd FA XI Cup: 8
 1890–91, 1934–35, 1935–36, 1957–58, 1965–66, 1970–71, 1973–74, 1984–85
 Reserve League Cup: 13
 1959–60, 1966–67, 1968–69, 1969–70, 1970–71, 1979–80, 1980–81, 1985–86, 1989–90, 1991–92, 1993–94, 1994–95, 1995–96,

Other

Kilsyth Charity Cup: 1
 1889

 Jock Stein Friendship Cup: 9
 2006, 2007, 2008, 2009, 2010, 2016, 2017, 2018, 2019

John Reames Trophy: 1
 2010

GFR Challenge Cup: 1
 2019

Third XI / B Team

Combined Reserve League: 3
 1960–61, 1962 –63, 1963–64

CRL Autumn Series: 1
  1963–64

CRL Spring Series: 4
 1959–60 (West), 1961–62, 1962–63, 1965–66

Youths
Domestic
SFL/SPL Youth League: 9
 1995, 2000, 2003, 2004, 2005, 2006, 2010, 2011, 2012
SPFL U20 League: 3
 2013, 2014, 2016
SPFL U19 League: 1
 2013
SPFL/CAS U17 League:
 2015, 2016, 2017
Scottish Youth Cup: 15
 1984, 1987, 1989, 1996, 1997, 1999, 2003, 2005, 2006, 2010, 2011, 2012, 2013, 2015, 2017
SPFL U19 League Cup: 1
 2014
 Glasgow Cup: 11  (Youth competition since 1990)
 1990, 1991, 1997, 1998, 2008, 2011, 2014, 2015, 2016, 2017, 2019
International
Blues Stars / FIFA Youth Cup: 1
 1986
 HKFC International Soccer Sevens: 1
 2009
 Super Cup NI (U19): 1
2018

Notes

Former youth team players
Players in Bold have senior international caps

 Roy Aitken
 Marc Anthony
 Gary Arbuckle
 Bahrudin Atajić
 Barry Bannan
 Craig Beattie
 Teddy Bjarnason
 Jimmy Boyle
 Gerry Britton
 Mark Burchill
 Tommy Burns
 Paul Caddis
 Graham Carey
 Jim Casey
 Dominic Cervi
 Joe Chalmers
 Paul Chalmers
 Marc Cocozza
 Ryan Conroy
 Barry John Corr
 Ronnie Coyle
 Stephen Crainey
 Danny Crainie
 Gerry Creaney
 Scott Cuthbert
 Karamoko Dembélé
 Simon Donnelly
 Ross Doohan
 Michael Doyle
 Michael Doyle
 Barry Elliot
 David Elliot
 Simon Ferry
 Islam Feruz
 Stuart Findlay
 Kjartan Finnbogason
 Darnell Fisher
 Sean Fitzharris
 James Forrest
 Mark Fotheringham
 Scott Fox
 Marcus Fraser
 Steve Fulton
 Declan Gallagher
 Tony Gallagher
 Michael Gardyne
 Paul George
 Jim Goodwin
 Liam Gormley
 Peter Grant
 Ross Harris
 Chris Hay
 Conor Hazard
 Colin Healy
 Ewan Henderson
 Liam Henderson
 Jack Hendry
 John Herron
 Gary Holt
 Gary Irvine
 Jackson Irvine
 Mikey Johnston
 Denny Johnstone
 James Keatings
 John Kennedy
 Liam Keogh
 Stewart Kerr
 Lewis Kidd
 Antons Kurakins
 Daniel Lafferty
 Paul Lawson
 Jacob Lensky
 Jamie Lindsay
 Simon Lynch
 Shaun Maloney
 David Marshall
 Jason Marr
 Alex Mathie
 John Paul McBride
 Kevin McBride
 Ryan McCann
 Dugald McCarrison
 Jamie McCart
 George McCluskey
 Brian McColligan
 Aiden McGeady
 Dylan McGeouch
 Mark McGeown
 Michael McGlinchey
 Jon-Paul McGovern
 Michael McGovern
 Paul McGowan
 Callum McGregor
 Jim McInally
 Kerr McInroy
 Des McKeown
 Brian McLaughlin
 Stephen McManus
 Mark McNally
 Anthony McParland
 Jamie McQuilken
 Paul McStay
 Willie McStay
 Chris Millar
 Mark Millar
 Calvin Miller
 Liam Miller
 Milan Mišůn
 Adam Montgomery
 Allan Morrison
 David Moyes
 Charlie Mulgrew
 Aidan Nesbitt
 Pat Nevin
 Charlie Nicholas
 Jim O'Brien
 Diarmuid O'Carroll
 Eoghan O'Connell
 Darren O'Dea
 Stephen O'Donnell
 Brian O'Neil
 Tomislav Pavlov
 John Potter
 Bryan Prunty
 Rocco Quinn
 Anthony Ralston
 Craig Reid
 Mark Reid
 Nicky Riley
 Andy Ritchie
 Luca Santonocito
 Tony Shepherd
 Cillian Sheridan
 Paul Slane
 Barry Smith
 Jamie Smith
 Greig Spence
 Mark Staunton
 Joe Thomson
 Robbie Thomson
 Kieran Tierney
 Lewis Toshney
 Richie Towell
 Andrew Traub
 John Traynor
 Filip Twardzik
 Patrik Twardzik
 Ross Wallace
 Sam Wardrop
 Calum Waters
 Tony Watt
 Stephen Welsh
 Derek Whyte
 David van Zanten
 Mo Yaqub

References

External links
Club Profile for UEFA Youth League

Reserves
Scottish reserve football teams
Youth football in Scotland
Football academies in Scotland
Premier League International Cup
UEFA Youth League teams
NextGen series
Lowland Football League teams